John Franklin Shafroth Jr. (March 31, 1887 – September 1, 1967) was a highly decorated officer in the United States Navy with the rank of Vice Admiral. He distinguished himself as Commander of destroyer USS Terry during World War I and received the Navy Cross, the United States Navy second-highest decoration awarded for valor in combat.

Shafroth Jr. rose to the flag rank during World War II and commanded Southeast Pacific Area or Battleship Squadron 2 during Battle of Okinawa. He led the first naval bombardment of mainland Japan during the World War II, on July 14, 1945.

Following the War, Shafroth remained in the Navy and commanded Seventh Naval district, Panama Sea Frontier and General Board of the Navy. He served as President, Naval Historical Foundation from 1961–1967. He was the son of Senator and former Governor of Colorado, John F. Shafroth. Shafroth Jr. was nicknamed "Big Jack" due to his weight of 280 pounds.

Early career

John F. Shafroth Jr. was born on March 31, 1887 in Denver, Colorado, the son of Senator and former Governor of Colorado, John F. Shafroth Sr. and Virginia Morrison. He had four siblings, but only two reached adult age. His younger brother Morrison was a Colorado Democratic Candidate in 1924 United States Senate elections, but lost to Republican Rice W. Means, who later became Ku Klux Klan leader. His youngest brother Will graduated from the University of Michigan and the University of California at Berkeley law school and became a lawyer. John Jr. did not followed his father's footsteps and after graduation from the Central High School in Washington, D.C., he earned an appointment to the United States Naval Academy at Annapolis, Maryland in summer 1904.

While at the Academy, Shafroth was an universal athlete, becoming champion in heavyweight boxing and heavyweight wrestling; establishing high hurdle record while a member of the Track team; and also was active in the football team. He reached the rank of Cadet-Petty Officer 1st Class and was nicknamed "Shadrow" by his classmates.

Among his classmates were several future admirals including: Harry A. Badt, Paul H. Bastedo, John R. Beardall, Abel T. Bidwell, Joseph J. Broshek, Arthur S. Carpender, Jules James, James L. Kauffman, Walter K. Kilpatrick, Thomas C. Kinkaid, Willis A. Lee Jr., William R. Munroe, William R. Purnell, Francis W. Rockwell and Richmond K. Turner.

He graduated with Bachelor of Science degree on June 15, 1908 and served as Passed Midshipman aboard the battleship USS Virginia during the cruise around the world with the Great White Fleet. While aboard Virginia, Shafroth visited Trinidad, Rio de Janeiro, Punta Arenas, Valparaíso, Hawaii, Melbourne, Sydney,  Auckland, Manila, Yokohama, Singapore, Ceylon, Suez Canal, Port Said, and Gibraltar.

Shafroth then spent next three years aboard Virginia with training, participating in the Fleet Exercise in the Caribbean. He was commissioned Ensign on June 6, 1910, after serving two years at sea required then by law. Shafroth was promoted to Lieutenant (junior grade) on June 6, 1913 and served consecutively aboard destroyers USS Jouett, USS Beale, USS Jenkins. While aboard Jenkins, he served as ship's Executive officer under Lieutenant Frederick V. McNair and took part in the American occupation of Veracruz in April 1914.

World War I

He was detached in September that year and ordered to the Bureau of Steam Engineering in Washington, D.C., where he served under Rear admiral Robert S. Griffin for next three years. While in this capacity, Shafroth was promoted to Lieutenant on August 29, 1916. Following the United States' entry into World War I in April 1917, Shafroth was promoted to the temporary rank of Lieutenant commander and assumed command of destroyer USS Terry at Charleston Navy Yard, South Carolina.

The Terry just underwent extensive repairs and upon completion, she began patrolling along the Atlantic coast and escorting merchantmen bound for Europe. Shafroth commanded Terry within the waters infested with enemy submarines and mines and participated in escorting and protecting of important convoys of troops and supplies through these waters. For his service in this capacity, he was decorated with Navy Cross, the United States Navy second-highest decoration awarded for valor in combat.

Shafroth was later transferred to command of Submarine Chaser Detachment 3 and was stationed in Berehaven, Ireland until December 1918, when he was ordered back to the United States.

Interwar period

Upon his return, Shafroth served consecutively aboard destroyers Upshur, Waters, and Philip and participated in the patrols off Azores and Atlantic until March 1920, when he returned to the Bureau of Steam Engineering as Officer-in-Charge of the Fuel Division. In April 1922, he was appointed Aide and Flag Secretary on the staff of Commander, Special Service Squadron, operating in the Caribbean under Rear admiral William C. Cole.

In June 1923, Shafroth was transferred to the staff of United States Fleet and served as Aide and Flag Secretary to its Commander-in-Chief, Admiral Robert Coontz. He was ordered to the Naval War College in Newport, Rhode Island in June 1925 and completed Senior course there in May of the following year. While at the college, Shafroth was promoted to Commander on November 16, 1925.

He was subsequently ordered for the instruction to the Army War College in Washington, D.C. and upon graduation in June 1927, Shafroth served as a member of the faculty until June 1928. Shafroth was then ordered to the battleship USS Arkansas and served as ship's Navigator under Captain Hayne Ellis during the patrolling of the Panama Canal Zone and the Caribbean until May 1930.

Shafroth was subsequently ordered to Washington, D.C., where he was assigned to the Bureau of Navigation (predecessor of the Bureau of Naval Personnel) and served there for next three years under Rear admiral Frank B. Upham. He was ordered for another tour of sea duty in June 1933, when he was appointed Executive officer aboard battleship USS West Virginia under future Chief of Naval Operations, Captain Harold R. Stark.

When he finally got his own "sea command" in June 1935, Shafroth was ordered the Naval Academy at Annapolis, where he was appointed commanding officer of USS Reina Mercedes, former Spanish Navy unprotected cruiser captured in 1898 during Spanish–American War, which was now used as a receiving ship. While in this capacity, he was promoted to Captain on July 1, 1936.

However by the end of August 1938, Shafroth were given orders to assume command of modern heavy cruiser Indianapolis, which was commissioned into service back in July 1931. He led his ship during the patrols in the Pacific until August 1940, when he was ordered back to the Bureau of Navigation in Washington, D.C. for duty as Director of Naval Reserve Division. He reported to the Director of the Bureau then-Rear admiral Chester Nimitz and became his deputy in June 1941. While in this capacity, Shafroth befriended Nimitz and his family, which influenced Shafroth's later career.

World War II

Panama and Hawaii
Following the Japanese attack on Pearl Harbor in December 1941, Shafroth was promoted to the temporary rank of Rear admiral and assumed temporary command of Cruiser Division 3 as substitute for his classmate, Abel T. Bidwell. His command consisted of old cruiser Richmond and Trenton, and was originally designated as Task Force for reinforcing of the garrison on Samoa, but before Shafroth could embarked with his command for South Pacific, he was replaced with experienced Rear admiral Frank J. Fletcher in early January 1942.

Shafroth was then appointed Commander, Southeast Pacific Area with headquarters in Balboa, Panama Canal Zone. The old cruisers Richmond and Trenton were meanwhile replaced with newer ships and transferred to Shafroth's command to his disposal. Shafroth also received third cruiser Cruiser, and several additional destroyers and auxiliary vessels at his disposal. His area of responsibility was drawn from the Mexico-Guatemala border to the mid-Pacific near Clipperton Island and then southward to the South Pole.

Although his area of responsibility was huge and force assigned to his command tiny, it proved to be more than sufficient due to lack of Japanese activity. Shafroth then focused on the escort convoy duty and helped transport 4,500 men to Bora Bora in French Polynesia, and another 20,000 troops to New Caledonia and Kanton Island.

In December 1942, Shafroth was ordered to Hawaii and was attached to the headquarters of the Pacific Fleet under his old superior, now four-star Admiral Chester Nimitz, who appointed Shafroth to the capacity of Deputy Commander, South Pacific Area under Vice admiral William F. Halsey. While in this capacity, he was co-responsible for the administration of several subordinated commands, including South Pacific Amphibious Force; South Pacific Naval Forces; South Pacific Island Bases; South Pacific Aircraft command and South Pacific Service Squadron.

Shafroth remained in this capacity until March 1944, when he was appointed Inspector General, Pacific Fleet and Pacific Ocean areas under Nimitz. This non-combat duty lasted until December 1944, when he was informed about his new assignment in combat area. While in this capacity, he served as a President of the Naval Board of Inquiry for West Loch disaster in May 1944. For his service with Southeast Pacific Force; South Pacific Area and as Inspector General, Pacific Fleet, he was decorated with Legion of Merit.

Philippines, Okinawa and Japan

On December 26, 1944, Shafroth was appointed Commander, Battleship Division 8 (BatDiv 8), built around fast battleships Massachusetts and Alabama. His battleships then operated with the aircraft carriers of Fast Carrier Task Force under Vice admiral Marc Mitscher, which made a series of raids on Formosa and Okinawa, to support the invasion of Lingayen Gulf in the northern Philippines.

Shafroth's Division was reorganized by the end of January 1945 and now he had battleships Indiana, Massachusetts and South Dakota (his flagship) under his command. During next four months, BatDiv 8 engaged in operations in support of amphibious operations at Iwo Jima in February that year; and conducted bombardment of the southeastern coast of Okinawa on March 24, 1945 in order to provide cover for minesweeping operations preparatory to landing on Okinawa.

The BatDiv 8 then provided cover for fast carrier operations against Tokyo, Kyushu, and in the Inland Sea area and destroyed 54 enemy planes by its anti-aircraft batteries. For his leadership of BatDiv 8 at Lingayen Gulf, Iwo Jima and Okinawa, Shafroth received his second Legion of Merit.

He was tasked to attack the ironworks at Kamaishi in northern Honshu. At the time the city had a population of 40,000 and the ironworks was among the largest in Japan. However, due to shortages of coking coal and other raw materials, the ironworks was running at less than half its capacity. It was the first naval bombardment of mainland Japan during the World War II.

Following the sudden death of Vice admiral Willis Augustus Lee of heart attack, Shafroth assumed command of Battleship, Squadron Two on August 25, 1945 and led his command during another bombardment on the night of August 29–30, 1945. This time on the city of Hamamatsu, destroying industrial and railroad targets, inflicting heavy damage to the enemy, without any casualties to U.S. ships. For the leadership of his Task Unit during the bombardment of Japan, Shafroth received third and fourth Legion of Merit.

Postwar service

Upon the Surrender of Japan, Shafroth participated in the surrender ceremony aboard battleship Missouri in Tokyo Bay on September 2, 1945 and returned to the United States in December that year. He was subsequently ordered to Miami, Florida, where he assumed duty as Seventh Naval district with additional duty as Commander, Gulf Sea Frontier.

Shafroth served in this capacity until the beginning of July 1946, when he was transferred to Balboa, Panama Canal Zone, where he served back in 1942 and assumed duty as Commandant, Fifteenth Naval district with additional duty as Commander, Panama Sea Frontier. For his wartime and postwar service in Panama, Shafroth was decorated by the governments of Colombia, Ecuador, Panama, and Peru.

In April 1948, Shafroth returned to the United States and assumed duty as Chairman of the General Board of the Navy at the Navy Department. He remained in this assignment until his transfer to the Retired list of the Navy on April 1, 1949 after 40 years of service. Shafroth was advanced to the rank of Vice Admiral on the retired list for having been specially commended in combat.

Retirement

Following his retirement from the Navy, Shafroth resided in Washington, D.C. and was active in the Naval Historical Foundation. He was elected President of the Foundation in 1961 and remained in that assignment until his death from a stroke on September 1, 1967, aged 80. Vice admiral John F. Shafroth Jr. was buried with full military honors at Arlington National Cemetery, Virginia together with his wife, Helena Marshall Fischer (1882–1975). They had one daughter.

Decorations

Here is the ribbon bar of Vice Admiral Shafroth:

See also
 Jones–Shafroth Act

References

1887 births
1967 deaths
People from Denver
United States Naval Academy alumni
Naval War College alumni
United States Army War College alumni
United States Navy vice admirals
United States Navy World War II admirals
United States Navy personnel of World War I
Recipients of the Navy Cross (United States)
Recipients of the Legion of Merit
Recipients of the Order of the Sun of Peru
Burials at Arlington National Cemetery
Military personnel from Colorado